Mister World 2003 was the 4th edition of the Mister World competition. It was held at the Brewery Hall in London, England on August 9, 2003. Ignacio Kliche of Uruguay crowned Gustavo Narciso Gianetti of Brazil at the end of the event.

Results

Placements

Special Awards

Teams

Contestants

Judges
 Julia Morley Chairwoman of Miss World Limited
 Azra Akin – Miss World 2002 from Turkey
 Sophie Blake
 Jodie Marsh
 James Mullinger
 Tom Nuyens
 Cleo Rocos

Notes and references

External links
 Official website
 Contestant lists of Mr World
 Official PR Team

Mister World
2003 beauty pageants
2003 in London
Beauty pageants in the United Kingdom